Charles Edward Macauley (March 22, 1928 – November 8, 2011) was a professional basketball player and coach. His playing nickname was "Easy Ed". Macauley played in the National Basketball Association (NBA) from 1949–1959 for the St. Louis Bombers, Boston Celtics, and St. Louis Hawks. During his career, Macauley earned 7 All-Star selections and won a championship with the Hawks in 1958. He played college basketball for Saint Louis.

Early life
Macauley spent his prep school days at St. Louis University High School, then went on to Saint Louis University, where his team won the NIT championship in 1948. He was named the AP Player of the Year in 1949. His nickname of "Easy Ed" came during a pre-game warmup, when fans shouted "Take it easy, Ed" because he (the captain of the team) did not realize he had ran down the court during the playing of the national anthem.

Professional career

Macauley played in the NBA with the St. Louis Bombers, Boston Celtics, and St. Louis Hawks. Macauley was named MVP of the first NBA All-Star Game (he played in the first seven) and he was named to the NBA's All-NBA First Team in three consecutive seasons. He was named to the All-NBA second team for the only time in the 1953–54 season while also leading in field goal percentage. However, it is a trade orchestrated by Celtics owner Walter A. Brown that Macauley is likely best known for, as he was traded from the Boston Celtics to the St. Louis Hawks on the day of the 1956 NBA draft (April 29, 1956). He and Cliff Hagan were sent to the Hawks for Bill Russell, who was drafted as the second overall pick in the draft that day (he later stated that if he was drafted by St. Louis, he wouldn't have been in the NBA as he called it an "overwhelmingly racist" city). For his part, Macauley convinced a reluctant Brown to trade him as it would do him a favor, as Macauley's son had been diagnosed with spinal meningitis and was in St. Louis receiving care at the time. All three players would eventually make the Hall of Fame, although Russell is considered one of the greatest players in league history.

Macauley made the NBA Finals in 1957, averaging 14.9 points and 5.9 rebounds per game in the seven-game series, which saw the Hawks lose to the Celtics (making their first Finals appearance in team history) in seven games. In the 1958 NBA Finals, the Hawks faced the Boston Celtics. The Hawks had four future Hall of Famers with Macauley while the Celtics had eight. In his final playoff series played, he averaged 5.8 points and 6.3 rebounds in the seven-game series, which the Hawks won in seven games. He was named player-coach for the 1958-59 season, and he played in fourteen games (all regular season) before retiring as a player. After one more season as coach, he retired, having led them to the 1960 NBA Finals, which they lost in seven games to the Celtics. In the two years Macauley coached with the Hawks, he led them to an 89–48 record, with a 9–11 playoff record.

Legacy

Macauley scored 11,234 points in ten NBA seasons and was inducted into the Naismith Memorial Basketball Hall of Fame in 1960. At age 32, he still holds the record for being the youngest male player to be admitted. His uniform number 22 was retired by the Celtics in October 16, 1963, the same date when his teammate, Bob Cousy retired his number 14. He was also awarded a star on the St. Louis Walk of Fame. His no. 22 jersey was retired by the Celtics, making him one of only two Celtics to have a retired number without winning a championship with the team, the other player being Reggie Lewis.

Personal life
After retiring, he became sports director of KTVI, then the ABC affiliate in his native St. Louis. In 1989, Macauley was ordained a deacon of the Catholic Church. With Father Francis Friedl, he co-authored the book Homilies Alive: Creating Homilies That Hit Home.

Macauley died on November 8, 2011, at his home in St. Louis, Missouri at the age of 83.

NBA career statistics

Regular season

Playoffs

References

External links

 
 BasketballReference.com: Ed Macauley (as coach)
 BasketballReference.com: Ed Macauley (as player)

1928 births
2011 deaths
All-American college men's basketball players
American men's basketball players
American Roman Catholics
Basketball coaches from Missouri
Basketball players from St. Louis
Boston Celtics players
Centers (basketball)
Naismith Memorial Basketball Hall of Fame inductees
National Basketball Association All-Stars
National Basketball Association broadcasters
National Basketball Association players with retired numbers
Player-coaches
Power forwards (basketball)
Saint Louis Billikens men's basketball players
St. Louis Bombers (NBA) draft picks
St. Louis Bombers (NBA) players
St. Louis Hawks head coaches
St. Louis Hawks players
American Roman Catholic deacons